Sofia Residents in Excess is a Bulgarian TV comedy-drama series produced by BTV and Dream Team Production that premiered on BTV on 23 March 2011.

Plot 
Two families from the Bulgarian capital – Chekanovi (the Chekanovs) and Lyutovi (the Lyutovs) – are in constant competition among each other. They used to live in the outmost metropolitan district of Izvor, but they have moved to central metropolitan district and are real Sofia residents now.

Cast

The Chekanov Family (Chekanovi) 
 Grandma Mariyka Chekanova (Stoyanka Mutafova) - mother of Rangel
 Rangel Chekanov (Lyubomir Neikov) – former Mayor of Izvor, former member of the parliament and former caretaker prime minister
 Galabina Chekanova (Albena Pavlova) - wife of Rangel, housewife
 Radko Chekanov (Vasil Draganov) – the son
 Mariya Chekanova/Lyutova (Violeta Markovska) -  the daughter, wife of Andrey Lyutov (season 1-4)

The Lyutov Family (Lyutovi)  
 Yordan Lyutov (Krustyo Lafazanov) - husband of Slaveya, former Mayor of Izvor
 Slaveya "Slavka" Lyutova (Silvia Lulcheva) - wife of Yordan, former member of the parliament
 Spas Lyutov (Ruslan Maynov) - eldest son of Yordan and Slaveya; former doctor
 Andrey Lyutov (Ivan Jurukov) - son of Yordan and Slaveya; photographer, TV producer
 Yana Lyutova (Mina Markova) - daughter of Yordan and Slaveya
 Yovka Lyutova (Eva Tepavicharova) - wife of Spas Lyutov

Other characters 
 Dominik Strosran (Ivan Radoev)
 Pop Grigoriy - Grishata (Nencho Ilchev) - local priest
 Zoya (Ernestina Shinova) - wife of Plamen Tsekov
 Plamen (Patso) Tsekov (Hristo Garbov), twin brother of Konstantin Tsekov
 Konstantin Tsekov (Hristo Garbov), twin brother of Plamen Tsekov
 Dimo Tsekov (Ivan Panayotov) – son of Plamen Tsekov, accountant
 Petar 'Pepi' Peychev (Petyo Petkov) - friend of Andrey, TV producer
 Eleonora Veron (Evelin Kostova) - dating Andrey Lyutov 
 Kameliya (Daniela Stamova) - Eleonora's best friend, dating Pepi

Guest stars 
 Preslava as herself (season 1)
 Georgi Kaloyanchev as Georgi grandma Mariyka first love (season 2)
 Orlin Goranov as Venelin Draganov, writer (season 2)
 Desi Slava as Vyara Toneva, pop singer (season 3)
 Doni as Toni, pop singer (season 4)
 Ralitsa Kovacheva-Bezhan (season 5)
 Daniel Tsochev (season 5)
 Atanas Mihaylov (season 5) 
 Hristo Stoichkov as God (season 5)
 Azis as cook in jail (season 7)
 Dimitar Kovachev - Funky as The Kraut, cellmate of Plamen Tsekov (season 7)
 Maria Ilieva as Mariya Skala, opera singer (season 8)
 Blagoy Georgiev - friend of grandma Mariyka (season 9)
 Evgeni Budinov as lawyer (season 9)
 Robert Yanakiev as prosecutor (season 9)
 100 Kila as Tsanko, student (season 9)
 Hristina Apostolova as Karolina, Macedonian spy (season 9)
 duet Riton as themselves (season 9)
 Lyubo Ganev as Bulgarian Olympic Committee President (season 10)
 Stefan Danailov (season 10)

Episodes

References

Official website 
 
 Official website on BTV (Bulgarian)

Bulgarian television series
2010s Bulgarian television series
2011 Bulgarian television series debuts
BTV (Bulgaria) original programming